Amblyseius kalandadzei is a species of mite in the family Phytoseiidae.

References

kalandadzei
Articles created by Qbugbot
Animals described in 1968